Adrian Griffith may refer to:

 Adrian Griffith (cricketer) (born 1971), former West Indies cricketer
 Adrian Griffith (athlete) (born 1984), Bahamian sprinter

See also
 Adrian Griffiths (born 1959), Welsh cricketer